Lior Goldenberg (born September 28, 1974) is a producer and mixer from Tel Aviv, Israel. He currently resides in Los Angeles, California. He has worked with Rancid, Macy Gray, Sheryl Crow, MxPx, Vanessa Carlton, Marilyn Manson, Andrew W.K., Crosby, Stills, Nash & Young, Alanis Morissette, Ziggy Marley, and indie bands Allen Stone, Crash Kings, Saint Motel and Wil Seabrook. He works out of his private studio in Woodland Hills.

On October 4, 2011 Allen Stone released a self-titled album that was produced by Lior. In an interview Allen described the experience of working with Lior as "a dream come true."

References

External links
 

1974 births
Living people
American people of Israeli descent
Israeli audio engineers
Israeli record producers